The American animated series OK K.O.! Let's Be Heroes features a fictional cast created by Ian Jones-Quartey.

Main

K.O. 

K.O. is the protagonist of the show. He is the son of Carol, and the newest employee at "Gar's Bodega", located in Lakewood Plaza. His birthday is June 18, which is also the PIN for his mom's credit card. K.O. is optimistic, loyal and willing to help anyone. While he can be simple-minded and gullible, he can easily be relied on by his friends, whom he cares for deeply. He's revealed to be a dog in Season 1, Episode 40. He is also easily amazed by anything hero or weapon-related and is always looking for advice on how to be a proper hero, usually from his mother. In "Know Your Mom," K.O. believed that his mother quit being a hero when he was born, but learns that this was not the case. In that same episode, it's shown that he didn't know her name until then. K.O. has low intelligence as for a long time he was unaware that Mr. Logic was a robot, or that his mom cooked his food (he thought it came from the "Dinner Man"). He does at times showcase deductive reasoning and has been shown to be manipulative, particularly towards Darrell and Shannon. After being trapped by T.K.O in their subconscious in "Carl", K.O. manages to finally integrate his alter ego in the series finale and becomes the new owner of "Gar's Bodega" in the epilogue.

His hero level gradually increased as the series went on; initially starting at Level 0, he levelled up to 0.1, 1, 2, 3, 4 and 99 in the current timeline of the series, attaining Level 100 in the time skip shown in the series finale and "You're Level 100!", but the latter instance was due to a Pow Card glitch.

Enid
Voiced by Mena Suvari (Pilot), Ashly Burch (series)
Hero Level: 5 (Currently)

Enid is a teenage witch who works as a cashier at the bodega, claiming herself as a ninja and that her werewolf father and vampire mother are a supermodel and spy. Enid is the most practical and down to earth of the employees but seems to lack motivation in her job despite being shown to handle out-of-control situations, like in the events of "We've Got Pests" where she convinced a group of partiers to grow up and discover themselves. In her preteen years, Enid attended "Ghoul School", and was rather shy and insecure, being embarrassed of her family and wanting to be a ninja. But after the events of "Parents Day", Enid learns to accept her family's quirks as her parents warm up to her career choice, later reconnecting with her old friends from Ghoul School. She and Red Action eventually start dating, and are shown running a dojo together in the series epilogue episode.

Radicles
Voiced by Ian Jones-Quartey
Hero Level: 3 (Currently)

Radicles, most often known as Rad, is an alien teenager from Planet X, who also works as a shelf stocker at the bodega. Rad slacks off the most out of the trio despite claiming to be all-powerful and showing off. He boasts a tough masculine exterior, but is actually rather mild compared to other heroes and, as shown in "You Are Rad," possesses a softer side that he refuses to acknowledge for fear of being embarrassed. In fact, Rad is more prone to crying than the others and is therefore much more sensitive to having his feelings hurt. In the series epilogue, Rad returns to earth after enlisting in the space army, and opens a Cat Cafe

Mr. Gar
Voiced by David Herman
Hero Level: 11

Eugene Garcia is the overseer of the plaza and owner of the bodega where K.O., Enid, and Rad work. He is tough, serious and prideful of the plaza and wishes that no harm will come of it. However, he has on occasion shown to not mind his employees slacking as he considers it "normal". He finds it uncomfortable to be emotional around others, mainly Carol, whom he had feelings for though did not act on out of guilt. In his younger days, Mr. Gar was originally a P.O.I.N.T. member codenamed El-Bow who fell in love with his fellow recruit Carol, who was in love with their senior Laser Blast. But he was fired from P.O.I.N.T. after he inadvertently distracted Carol from a stakeout that got Laser Blast killed. After a time of wandering, Mr. Gar was entrusted with the land he built the plaza on by the President of the Universe, who enlists him for several secret missions. In "T.K.O.," Mr. Gar manages to open up about how proud he is of K.O. while openly admitting his feelings for Carol. After a three-month time skip at the start of the second season, it is revealed that Mr. Gar and Carol have begun dating and that Mr. Gar has taken a father-like role to K.O.

Carol
Voiced by Kate Flannery
Hero Level: 11

Carol is K.O.'s tough yet doting mother and the owner of "Fitness Emotions" at the plaza, usually visited by Ginger, Gladys and Gertie. She usually gives her son helpful advice only a mother could give, though it's not always clear what it is she is trying to teach. She is good friends with Mr. Gar but is slightly oblivious to his feelings for her. However, in "T.K.O.", she seems to acknowledge Mr. Gar's feelings for her but doesn't seem to care, or at least seems to have known all along. In that same episode, it is revealed that Carol trained K.O. himself since his infancy. In her younger days, Carol was originally a P.O.I.N.T. member code-named Silver Spark who had feelings for the group's senior member Laser Blast with his apparent death leading her to initially bear a grudge on Mr. Gar for keeping her from preventing it, but forgave him as he technically saved her life and knew of his crush for her. After a three-month time skip following the first-season finale, having started dating Mr. Gar, Carol is revealed to still be a P.O.I.N.T. agent in secret as she is safeguarding the glorb tree under the plaza to prevent intervention by P.O.I.N.T.

Recurring

Lakewood Plaza Employees
Ms. Mummy, voiced by Ashly Burch
Beardo, voiced by David Herman
Baby Teeth, voiced by Ashly Burch

Real Magic Skeleton and Brandon
Hero Level: 2
Employees at the plaza's "iFrame Outlet" frame store owned by Sir eFram iFrame. Real Magic Skeleton (voiced by Ben Jones) is an idealistic living skeleton with magical powers, while Brandon (voiced by David Herman) is a laidback humanoid bear who sometimes gets on Real Magic Skeleton's nerves yet values their friendship.

Dendy
Voiced by Melissa Fahn 
Hero Level: 3

Dendy is a kappa in the same grade as K.O., who uses technology to fight and is his best friend. In "I Am Dendy" she approached K.O. on the pretext of needing help fixing her backpack so she could study him, but bonded with him over their shared interests and now considers him a friend. Though Dendy is aware of K.O.'s lack of tech expertise, this does not appear to phase her even when he accidentally released a virus on the plaza. She ultimately values her time with K.O. and considers him a close friend. In "You're in Control" Dendy tells K.O. that she loves him and that he is appreciated, even admitting that he has helped her in the "emotional sciences". In the series finale, Dendy becomes C.E.O. of the POW card company.

Mr. Logic
Voiced by James Urbaniak
Hero Level: 2

Mr. Logic is a robotic hairstylist who owns the "Logic Cuts" barbershop at the plaza, able to scan and add up everyone's hero levels. In the episode "Lad & Logic", Mr. Logic was revealed to originally be created by Lord Boxman and helped set up Boxmore. But Boxman's insistence to destroy the then unfinished plaza rather than robots for other villains to earn a profit convinced Mr. Logic to leave him after meeting Mr. Gar and being Lakewood Plaza Turbo's first worker.

Drupe
Voiced by Melissa Villaseñor
Hero Level: 1

Drupe is a humanoid strawberry teenager who hangs out with Red Action and Gregg as one of the Cool Teens, usually making fun of others to hide her own negative traits as she is shy about her fashion blog. In the aftermath of "You're Everybody's Sidekick" when K.O. got her blog exposure, Drupe gradually loosened up and has become friendlier to K.O. and his friends. In "RMS & Brandon's First Episode", revealed to be friends with A Real Magic Skeleton and Brandon, Drupe takes a job as a coffee barista in the plaza after RMS indirectly convinced her that she should do something with her life. She developed her own business following the events of "Project Ray Way".

P.O.I.N.T. (Powerful Operatives Investigating and Neutralizing Trouble)
A superhero organization that Mr. Gar and Carol were originally members of.

Foxtail
Voiced by Melodee Spevack
Hero Level: 10+
Foxtail, the leader of P.O.I.N.T., possesses a muscular physique along with a foxtail and matching orange hair. During Mr. Gar's time as a P.O.I.N.T. member, initially appearing in flashback sequences. But after Laser Blast's apparent death, Foxtail ran P.O.I.N.T. like a military force as she believed power is the only way to protect everyone. Making her first physical appearance in "Point to the Plaza", Foxtail expresses disdain towards Mr. Gar and looked down on his current place in life at the Plaza.

She is the head of P.O.I.N.T. Prep's Strength House where she shows a social Darwinist outlook in her expectations that all superheroes are not created equal and only a few are worthy, wanting custody of the glorb tree under Lakewood Plaza Turbo to supply her forces with power-ups. In the second-season finale, Foxtail takes over the plaza for a duration of two months before accepting defeat and naming Elodie her successor while retiring.

Doctor Greyman
Voiced by Dana Snyder

Doctor Greyman is a grey alien wearing a fedora and purple scarf, being the team's scientist. He originally possessed telekinesis but lost it to a power-draining weapon. Years later, despite being looked down on for being powerless, Greyman is the head of P.O.I.N.T. Prep's Wisdom House where he is shown in a wheelchair and wearing a fake beard while speaking in a German accent. Greyman is later revealed to be Chip's creator, fired by Foxtail from P.O.I.N.T. Prep when he used she manipulated and refused to help her in her plans. He later returns in "Chip's Damage", convincing K.O. and Elodie to let Chip be retired.

Rippy Roo
Voiced by Ashly Burch

Rippy Roo is a small blue kangaroo with boxing gloves that joined P.O.I.N.T. along with Carol and Mr. Gar, supposedly accepted into the team because of her adorable nature making her something of a mascot. She only speaks in a burbled animal language that P.O.I.N.T. members somehow understand. Rippy's pouch is a literal wormhole that allows her to carry an insurmountable amount of objects. Following Laser Blast's funeral, Rippy left PO.I.N.T. on her devices upon realizing the path its remaining members were taking. Rippy returns in "Whatever Happened to... Rippy Roo?", revealed to have become a physic scientist and having secretly attempted to retrieve Laser Blast as she reconnects with Carol.

Chip Damage
Voiced by Kurt Angle
Hero Level: 10, 15 (In "Mystery Science Fair 201X")

Chip Damage is a celebrity superhero that is looked up to by many other heroes, later revealed to be an android created by Doctor Greyman for that exact purpose following the apparent death of Laser Blast. Chip makes his first actual appearance in "Point to the Plaza" where it is shown that he cares more for his fans than he does actually helping anyone. Despite his "best" efforts, Enid and K.O. end up saving the Plaza resulting in Chip suggesting the former join P.O.I.N.T. Prep Academy.  Despite this, Chip is still technically a responsive hero who gives support to young up and comers. But Foxtail uses a remote control made to modify Chip's programming to have him secretly power up their students by secretly imbuing them with glorbs that he remotely activates at will, with Elodie and Sparko being among the students of his special class, before Chip was deactivated. Elodie attempts to bring back Chip in "Chip's Damage" before Dr. Greyman convinces her to retire the android so the next generation of heroes can take over.

Professor Sunshine
Voiced by Melanie Chartoff

Professor Sunshine is a living cloud person who is the head of P.O.I.N.T. Prep's Charisma House. Unlike her fellow P.O.I.N.T. members, Sunshine is optimistic and very supportive whenever she displays her sunlight abilities. However, she can change herself to being a cold front cloud which she uses to search the hallways for after-hours students. At this point, she has an unforgiving demeanor.

Elodie
Voiced by Reshma Shetty
Hero Level: 4

Elodie is a popular superhero who attends P.O.I.N.T. Prep Academy, initially Enid's childhood friend before betraying her during school entrances. When Elodie returns to Lakewood Plaza Turbo, she loses to Enid in an exhibition rematch. Despite Elodie's indifferent and uncaring nature towards Enid, she still considers her a friend despite hiding it and her drive to be the best. Elodie eventually makes peace with Enid during the latter's time in P.O.I.N.T. Prep when she places Enid's life above winning their match. This ultimately resulted in Elodie helping Enid expose Chip Damage, having been a participant in being infused with glorbs on a regular basis. While Enid chooses to leave P.O.I.N.T. Prep, Elodie decides to stay as she feels she had worked hard to get where she is and wants to make the school a better place. Elodie later returns in the second-season finale "Dark Plaza" as Foxtail's right hand before being promoted as the new leader of P.O.I.N.T.

Other heroes
Gregg, voiced by Ian Jones-Quartey
Bell Beefer, voiced by Michael-Leon Wooley
Mega Football Baby, voiced by Melissa Villaseñor
Nick Army, voiced by Chris Niosi
Joff the Shaolin Monk, voiced by James Urbaniak (originally), Johnny Wu (starting in "Be a Team")
Punching Judy, voiced by Melissa Villaseñor
Ted the Viking and Foxy, voiced by Michael-Leon Wooley and Ashly Burch respectively
Neil, voiced by Chris Niosi
Shy Ninja, voiced by Melissa Villaseñor
Rex Th' Bunny, voiced by Robbie Daymond
Holo-Jane, voiced by Kari Wahlgren (originally), Lola Kirke (starting in "Your World is an Illusion")
Sparko, voiced by Ron Funches

Red Action
Voiced by Kali Hawk
Hero Level: 5

Red Action is a cyborg teenage girl from the year 301X as a member of a superhero team known as the Hue Troop, escaping to the present after accidentally shattering her team's Prism Crystal. First appearing in "You're Everybody's Sidekick" where she hung with Drupe and Gregg as one of the Cool Teens, Red Action became less feisty mood after K.O. arranged for her to get a haircut from Mr. Logic. While she refuses to thank K.O. to keep her reputation, she respected him and later became close friends with Enid in "Back in Red Action" when the Hue Squad found her where she acquired a past iteration of the Prism Crystal and is forgiven by her old team. Red Action leaves 201X to help her team fight off a threat in 301X in "Red Action to the Future", using a neglected Enid's actions to alter the war's duration from years to a few hours so she can enjoy her youth in the present. Red Action eventually becomes Enid's girlfriend with the two running a dojo together in the series epilogue.

Citizens
Colewort, voiced by Cole Sanchez
Potato, voiced by Melissa Villaseñor
Chameleon Jr., voiced by Tony Revolori
Gladys, voiced by Stephanie Nadolny in the pilot, and Ashly Burch in the series
Gertie, voiced by Kate Flannery in the pilot, and Melissa Villaseñor in the series
Ginger, voiced by Mena Suvari in the pilot, and by Melissa Villaseñor, then Carol Kane in the series
Joe Cuppa, voiced by Andres du Bouchet
Crinkly Wrinkly, voiced by Ian-Jones Quartey, and Keith David in "Legends of Mr. Gar"
Dynamite Watkins, Action News Anchor, voiced by Mary Elizabeth McGlynn
Pird, voiced by Chris Niosi, Ian Jones-Quartey in "You Get Me"
Skateboard Nerd, voiced by Parker Simmons
Miss Quantum, voiced by Mary Elizabeth McGlynn
Bernard, voiced by Dave Fennoy
Wilhamena, voiced by Melique Berger
Icky and Boris, voiced by Ashly Burch and Ian Jones-Quartey respectively
Dogmun, voiced by "Realistic Stock Dog Bark"

Guest Heroes

Hero

Voiced by Michael Sinterniklaas
Origin: RPG World
Hero Level: 90+

A mysterious hero who has been attempting to finish a quest that involves defeating his nemesis, Galgarion. He has spiky blonde hair and a big sword and follows RPG logic such as grinding and overstocking on potions. After another encounter with Galgarion that ends in a draw, K.O. is fed up with their repetitive cycle and wishes to do other things. Inspired by his epiphany, Hero decides to do the same thing and returns to his girlfriend, Cherry, whom he marries and has a baby with her they named Spaghetti and he resumes doing quests but this time his family joins him on his adventures.

Captain Planet
Voiced by David Coburn
Origin: Captain Planet and the Planeteers
Hero Level: Planet

An eco-friendly superhero that can only be summoned through the power of the five elemental rings: Earth, Wind, Fire, Water and Heart. As his name implies, he fights to protect the earth from all forms of eco-wrongdoing including pollution, greed and crime. He is highly revered by the residents of Lakewood Plaza. Captain Planet is once again called upon by the Planeteers, which consists of Kwame and the Lakewood Plaza Heroes, to battle Dr. Blight and Lord Boxman. He and Kwame attempted to stop climate change many years ago but were unable to, resulting in all the Planeteers except Kwame quitting. However, thanks to K.O., Enid and Rad, the gang create a PSA to remind people to preserve the planet, with the original Planeteers appearing in non-speaking cameos.

Kwame
Voiced by LeVar Burton
Origin: Captain Planet and the Planeteers
Kwame is one of the five Planeteers who summons Captain Planet. He hails from Ghana and possesses the Earth ring. The other four Planeteers had given up due to the amount of eco-wrongdoing (and to get real jobs). With the help of the Lakewood Plaza Heroes, Kwame and Captain Planet defeat Lord Boxman and Dr. Blight. The gang create a PSA and it is implied that the other Planeteers returned as they too appear.

Grimwood Girls
Origin: Scooby-Doo and the Ghoul School

The Grimwood Girls were Enid's friends from before she attended Lakewood Plaza Elementary School. Each of them are students at Miss Grimwood's Finishing School for Ghouls. Their group consisted of:

 Phantasma (voiced by Russi Taylor) - A friendly ghost girl who leads the group and is the daughter of the Phantom.
 Sibella (voiced by Susan Blu) - A feisty vampire and the daughter of Count Dracula who is the most frightening of the group.
 Elsa Frankenteen (voiced by Pat Musick) - A tough and slightly slow-witted daughter of Frankenstein's monster.
 Winnie (voiced by Natalie Palamides) - A rambunctious werewolf girl and daughter of an unnamed werewolf.
 Tanis (voiced by Kristen Li) - A shy, but friendly mummy girl and daughter of an unnamed mummy.

The Grimwood Girls would hang out with Enid who was their witch of the group. Not having seen her in years, they were seemingly unaware of her transition to that of a ninja and insisted that she show off her witch powers. An enchanted tree caused by Enid's inexperience over the years eats Winnie and Tanis and proceeds to dance off with them. When Enid finally confesses that she no longer considers herself a monster like them, they admit that they knew all along that she was into ninjas. They nevertheless resolve her issue by rescuing Winnie and Tanis from the enchanted tree. Afterwards, the gang all dance together knowing that they are still friends.

Garnet
Voiced by Estelle
Origin: Steven Universe
Hero Level: Two gems

Garnet is the leader of the Crystal Gems, who was inexplicably taken from her world and ended up in Cartoon Network City. She teams up with K.O., Ben, and Raven to stop the villainous Strike and rescue the inhabitants of the multiverse. Over the course of "Crossover Nexus", Garnet forms a motherly bond with K.O. and a friendship of sorts with Ben and Raven. Initially, Strike destroys her sunglasses, which she says are prescription glasses meant to focus her future vision. Eventually, she and the team defeat Strike when K.O. retrieves his pen and returns the heroes' missing abilities. Before leaving to her own world, she uses Strike's pen to create a Pow Card of herself for K.O. and offers him words of encouragement.

Ben Tennyson / Ben 10
Voiced by Tara Strong (Ben) and John DiMaggio (Four Arms)
Origin: Ben 10 (2016 series) (series), Ben 10 (2005 series) (actual)

Ben Tennyson is a tween who possesses the Omnitrix, an alien watch that allows him to transform into various aliens. In "Crossover Nexus", he finds himself in Cartoon Network City along with K.O., Garnet and Raven and allies with them to battle Strike, a mysterious being who wants to destroy the Cartoon Network heroes. Strike ends up removing Ben's Omnitrix while he is still in his Four Arms mode, leaving him stuck in that form until he can get his Omnitrix back. Being rather young, he admires his own abilities above the rest of the team but nevertheless forms a special bond with them. Eventually, K.O. retrieves Strike's pen and returns Ben's Omnitrix and the other team's abilities. Ben's Omnitrix, however, now allows him to transform into any Cartoon Network character, which he uses to defeat Strike and save the Cartoon Network universe. Ben returns to his world excited to tell his cousin Gwen and Grandpa Max about his latest adventure.

Raven
Voiced by Tara Strong
Origin: Teen Titans Go! (series). DC Comics Presents #26 (October 1980) (actual)

Raven is a half-human, half-demon member of the Teen Titans. In "Crossover Nexus", she ends up in the Cartoon Network City where she was taken out by Strike, but not turned to stone like the others. She is rescued by K.O., Garnet and Ben 10 and immediately joins their group to take down Strike. Raven, while sarcastic and somewhat cynical, takes a liking to her new friends and even compliments K.O. for being "smarter than Beast Boy". K.O. manages to get Strike's pen and returns all the heroes' abilities, including Raven's magic. After defeating Strike and rescuing the other heroes, Raven uses her abilities to return K.O., Garnet and Ben home. When she tries to return home, she nearly ends up traveling to the world of Teen Titans before correcting herself at the last minute.

Sonic the Hedgehog
Voiced by Roger Craig Smith
Origin: Sonic the Hedgehog (1991)
Hero Level: Ring

Sonic is a blue anthropomorphic hedgehog and a world-famous hero who runs at supersonic speeds. He and Tails are lured to the bodega by Lord Boxman using a fake flyer advertising chili dogs, where he meets K.O. and is impressed by the young hero's knowledge of him, offering to make him his new "little buddy". When Darrell and Jethro kidnap Rad and Enid, he helps K.O. storm Boxmore to rescue them. He is forced to fight K.O. after being transformed into Metal K-0 by one of Lord Boxman's machines. Upon defeating Metal K-0, he dives into a pool of water to return him to normal despite being unable to swim, and they are both saved by Tails. The trio defeat Lord Boxman before Sonic and Tails leave to return the Master Emerald, which Lord Boxman stole from Knuckles the Echidna, with Sonic urging K.O. to have chili dogs next time he visits.

Miles "Tails" Prower
Voiced by Colleen Villard
Origin: Sonic the Hedgehog 2 (1992)

Tails is an anthropomorphic fox capable of flying using his two tails, and Sonic's best friend and sidekick. He joins Sonic on his trip to the bodega, where he becomes increasingly jealous of the attention Sonic gives K.O., believing Sonic intends to replace him as his sidekick. He helps Sonic infiltrate Boxmore and defeat Metal K-0 and Lord Boxman, with Sonic reassuring Tails that he will always remain his best friend and sidekick. Satisfied, Tails apologizes for his jealousy and makes amends with K.O. before the two leave the plaza.

Villains

Voxmore
Previously known as Boxmore, is a munitions factory for villains that is located across the street from Lakewood Plaza in the neutral zone.

Lord Boxman
Voiced by Jim Cummings
Hero Level: -10

Lord Boxman is the founder and CEO of Boxmore, obsessed with destroying the plaza. He despises "friendship" and views it as a weakness. His real name is Lad Boxman and he built his company with the help of his first creation Mr. Logic. But when Mr. Gar built Lakewood Plaza, Boxman's obsession with destroying it led to him falling out with Mr. Logic and building new and less logic-minded robots to aid in his schemes. Though Boxman was fired in the first-season finale as his obsession with the plaza lead to a falling out with his investors, he regains control of Boxmore after Professor Venomous bought full ownership and rebranded the company as Voxmore, but Boxman leaves his company for good after deeming Shadowy Venomous too evil by his own standards, leaving his remaining robots at Lakewood Plaza. Boxman returns in the series finale, getting back with Venomous in the epilogue.

Darrell
Voiced by Ian Jones-Quartey
Hero Level: -4

Darrell is the robot teenager "son" of Lord Boxman who wields a blaster on his arm, mass-produced so he can transfer his consciousness into a replacement body whenever a current one is destroyed with variations that include Mega Darrel. But the Darrell models as a whole act on a hive mind, which can be a bit detrimental if multiple Darrell models are activated all at once for menial purposes and cause the primary Darrel to become distracted. Besides an unusual obsession with playing dress up for no reason, Darrell also considered himself Boxman's favorite until his creator build Boxman Jr. He staged a coup and is promoted by the investors to the new owner of Boxmore as Lord Cowboy Darrell. Darrel made Boxmore more efficient under his leadership before later returning the company to Boxman long after he accepted him as the better boss. He becomes a hero after Lord Boxman abandons them in "Dendy's Video Channel".

Shannon
Voiced by Kari Wahlgren
Hero Level: -4

Shannon is the robot teenager "daughter" of Lord Boxman who produces buzz saws from her arms and legs, her body mass-produced so she can transfer her consciousness into a replacement body whenever her current one is destroyed. More capable and better equipped than Darrel, Shannon is as conniving though she secretly cares for her brother despite wanting to one-up him and prove herself as their father's favorite. Furthermore, Shannon is a loyal daughter to Boxman despite his abusive nature and thus follows his commands in a bizarre totalitarian fashion to not upset him.  She becomes a hero after Lord Boxman abandons them in "Dendy's Video Channel".

Raymond
Voiced by Robbie Daymond
Hero Level: -3

Raymond is the fashionable robot teenager "son" of Lord Boxman with an affinity for roses who fights using sports equipment, his body mass-produced so he can transfer his consciousness into a replacement body whenever his current one is destroyed. Compared to Darrell and Shannon, while sharing their refusal of being upstaged, Raymond is more powerful and combat trained.  He becomes a hero after Lord Boxman abandons them in "Dendy's Video Channel".

Ernesto
Voiced by Chris Niosi
Hero Level: -5
Ernesto is a top-hat wearing robot henchman of Lord Boxman, his body mass-produced so he can transfer his consciousness into a replacement body whenever his current one is destroyed. Ernesto mostly does office work at Boxmore, though is a formidable fighter when occasionally deployed with variant abilities depending on the model.  He becomes a hero after Lord Boxman abandons them in "Dendy's Video Channel".

Jethro
Voiced by David Herman
Hero Level: -1
Jethro is a "robo-child" or "robo-kid" henchman of Lord Boxman who can transfer his consciousness into a replacement body when he is destroyed. Jethro is a slow-moving robot who can only say "I am Jethro!", or "I am Mega Jethro!" in the case of the Mega Jethro model, which irritates Rad and Enid while hinting at Jethro's non-conscious and simple nature. The model as a whole functions as cannon fodder whose only object to moving function, Jethro having been known to read about existentialism in their spare time. During "Jethro's All Yours", K.O. attempted to reason to Jethro before accepting the robot is beyond any form of reasoning. But in the episode "I Am Jethro", one Jethro became sentient from being overloaded from glorbs during production and is currently hiding among his Jethro brothers with the intent of staging a revolt in Boxmore. While the other Jethro units were destroyed in "Dendy's Video Channel", the smart Jethro is revealed to have survived and returns alongside Boxman in the series finale with a later unit like Deathro modeled after him.

Mikayla
Voiced by Melissa Fahn
Hero Level: Unknown
Mikayla is an animal-based robot that resides in Boxmore as a "pet" in Boxman's family, her body is mass-produced so she can transfer her consciousness into a replacement body whenever the current one is destroyed.  She becomes a hero after Lord Boxman abandons them in "Dendy's Video Channel".

Boxman Jr.
Voiced by Jim Cummings
Hero Level: Unknown

Boxman Jr. is an infant robot modeled after Boxman whose existence is first hinted at in "Action News", where Boxman attempted to conceal his child's existence from the public. Boxman Jr. officially debuts in "You're in Control", installed with a chip that Professor Venomous gave Boxman and set to destroy Lakewood Plaza. K.O ultimately destroys Boxman Jr. after harnessing T.K.O.'s power.

Professor Venomous
Voiced by Steven Ogg
Hero Level: 8 (as Laserblast),  -8 (as Shadowy Venomous), -7 (currently)

Professor Venomous is a purple-skinned supervillain who was originally Laserblast, a well-known superhero and founding member of the superhero team P.O.I.N.T. who possessed the ability to siphon energy from others and fire energy blasts from his helmet. He developed a close relationship with Carol before he was apparently killed in action during a stakeout where he charged into a villain's lair and was seemingly sucked into a black hole, but he actually survived and lost his superpowers. Attempts at experimenting on himself to restore his lost powers resulted in his current purple, snake-like form, and an alternate personality known as Shadowy Figure. Venomous eventually resurfaced as a respected scientist in the villain community and one of Lord Boxman's clients. At some point, he gained a young humanoid rat "minion" named Fink who he treats like a daughter. During the first season, while Shadowy Figure used his time in control of the body to orchestrate the manifestation of T.K.O., Venomous expressed his admiration for Boxman by providing him with a bio-chip that would be used in Boxman Jr.'s creation. Regaining his passion for evil while taking in Boxman in "Boxman Crashes", Venomous uses the money he extorted from Congresswoman to buy Boxmore from its investors and reinstate Boxman as its head, with himself as Boxman's business partner. He also became Boxman's lover and began being referred to as the stepfather of Boxman's robotic children. Venomous' true identity as Laserblast (and thus K.O.'s biological father, though he was not aware of this until recently) is revealed in "Big Reveal", and he learns of Shadowy Figure's existence in "Let's Get Shadowy". Though Venomous promises K.O. he'll get rid of his alter ego, he is instead completely taken over by Shadowy Figure, with their Shadowy Venomous form talking T.K.O. into an alliance. In the finale, Shadowy Figure is destroyed by T.K.O once he learned he was being used, and Venomous and Fink are teleported to another planet by the President of the Universe. After returning to Earth in the epilogue episode, Venomous reconciles with Boxman and they eventually marry.

Fink
Voiced by Lara Jill Miller
Fink is a humanoid green rat who assists Professor Venomous, whom she treats as a father figure as he shows affection to her. Fink uses glorbs to temporarily power herself up into Turbo Fink. Fink is also revealed to know about Venomous' activities as Shadowy Figure, expressing disdain for him. In the finale, helping the heroes fight T.K.O., Fink is teleported alongside Venomous by the President of the Universe to another planet that they attack to their hearts' desire. Returning to Earth in the epilogue episode, Fink grows up to become an Esports competitor.

Other Villains

Cosma
Voiced by Marina Sirtis (originally), Betsy Zajko (starting in "Deep Space Vacation")
Cosma is an orange telekinetic reptile who causes objects to disappear and reappear at will while manipulating her body at a molecular level to turn herself into a planet-eating Kaiju. Cosma is also the leader of Boxmore's investors, having fired Boxman for putting his obsession with the plaza above the business before Professor Venomous bought the company.

Vormulax
Voiced by Kari Wahlgren
Hero Level: -6
Vormulax is an evil alien and Shy Ninja's arch-enemy. Despite their constant interactions, Vormulax is perplexed by Shy Ninja's shyness.

Billiam Milliam
Voiced by Justin McElroy
Hero Level: -7
Billiam Milliam is a gold-skinned supervillain, billionaire and investor.

Steamborg
Voiced by David Herman

Steamborg is a giant being made of levitating rocks and a villain from Carol and Mr. Gar's past.

T.K.O.
Voiced by Courtenay Taylor
Hero Level: -100
Turbo K.O., antisocial and rage-filled compared to K.O., is a manifestation of K.O.'s repressed anger and sense of helplessness which the Shadowy Figure got K.O. to manifest as an alternate personality. But T.K.O. gradually transitions into an anti-villain after he and K.O come to an understanding in the first-season finale, K.O. providing T.K.O. a means to exert his frustrations to freely use his powers without losing control. This means, however, that the two are permanently "chained" together. In "T.K.O.'s House", T.K.O. is revealed to have an existential crisis stemming from his obsession with Shadowy Figure's interest in him and K.O. While not getting all the answers he wanted when he and K.O. develop their Perfect K.O. form, T.K.O. got some closure from the attempted interrogation. But T.K.O. ends up being exiled to K.O.'s subconscious for the trouble he caused during the events of "T.K.O. Rules". T.K.O. later resurfaces in "Carl" and takes over K.O.'s body to confront Venomous about Shadowy Figure, only to be talked into an alliance with Shadowy Venomous. He is later defeated when K.O. realizes that T.K.O. has always been a part of him, resulting in the two merging permanently.

Guest Villains

Dr. Blight
Voiced by Tessa Auberjonois
Origin: Captain Planet and the Planeteers
An eco-terrorist.

Strike
Voiced by Michael Dorn
A sinister being of unknown origin who plotted to conquer the Cartoon Network world by taking down its heroes.

References

External links
 OK K.O.! Let's Be Heroes on Cartoon Network

Cartoon Network Studios characters
Cartoon Network Studios superheroes
OK K.O.! Let's Be Heroes
Lists of characters in American television animation
2010s television-related lists